Carlos Fradique Mendes is a fictional Portuguese adventurer. He was a youthful invention of the 19th-century Portuguese realist novelist Eça de Queiroz and his literary allies (who included Ramalho Ortigão). Fradique Mendes made an early appearance in print in the novel O Mistério da Estrada de Sintra ("The Mystery of the Sintra Road", 1870), written jointly by Eça and Ortigão. He attained full elaboration in the lengthy Correspondência de Fradique Mendes ("Correspondence of Fradique Mendes"), published after Eça's death in 1900. This was followed by a collection of further posthumous texts and drafts, Cartas inéditas de Fradique Mendes e mais páginas esquecidas ("Unpublished letters of Fradique Mendes and other forgotten pages").

Fradique Mendes was recast in a prize-winning novel by the Angolan author José Eduardo Agualusa titled Nação Crioula: a correspondência secreta de Fradique Mendes ("Creole Nation: the secret correspondence of Fradique Mendes").

External links
 
 

Portuguese literature
Angolan literature
Mendes, Fradique